Stak may mean:
 Stok, a museum and gompa in Ladakh in north India
 Stak, a valley in Gilgit-Baltistan Pakistan. 
 An exclamation commonly used by Norts in the Rogue Trooper fictional scenario
Stakataka, a Pokémon introduced in Generation VII

See also
Stack (disambiguation)